The following highways are numbered 160:

Australia
 Glenelg Highway

Canada
 New Brunswick Route 160
 Prince Edward Island Route 160 (Ascension Road)

Costa Rica
 National Route 160

India
 National Highway 160 (India)

Japan
 Japan National Route 160

United States
 U.S. Route 160
 Alabama State Route 160
 Arizona State Route 160 (former)
 Arkansas Highway 160
 California State Route 160
 Connecticut Route 160
 Georgia State Route 160 (former)
Hawaii Route 160
 Illinois Route 160
 Indiana State Road 160
 Iowa Highway 160
 Kentucky Route 160
 Louisiana Highway 160
 Maine State Route 160
 M-160 (Michigan highway) (former)
 Nevada State Route 160
 New Jersey Route 160 (former)
 New York State Route 160
 North Carolina Highway 160
 Ohio State Route 160
 Pennsylvania Route 160
 South Carolina Highway 160
 Tennessee State Route 160
 Texas State Highway 160
 Texas State Highway Loop 160
 Farm to Market Road 160
 Utah State Route 160
 Virginia State Route 160
 Washington State Route 160
 Wisconsin Highway 160
 Wyoming Highway 160
Territories
 Puerto Rico Highway 160